= Nemaska Lithium =

Nemaska Lithium Inc. is a Canadian mining company that seeks to develop a lithium mine, the Whabouchi property, in northern Quebec.
